Keyed In is an album by American pianist Joanne Brackeen recorded in 1979 and released on the Tappan Zee label.

Reception 

AllMusic reviewer Scott Yanow stated "Teamed up with bassist Eddie Gomez and drummer Jack DeJohnette, Brackeen sounds quite distinctive on seven of her originals, hinting a little at McCoy Tyner but coming up with fresh and advanced improvisations". Doug Payne stated "This is an amazingly good record from start to finish and the epitome of the jazz piano trio of the 1970s. Outside of Bill Evans, hardly anyone was making music like this at the time and Ms. Brackeen's command of the unit is simply mind boggling. She is a democratic leader overflowing with more ideas than can possibly be captured well in one album and Gomez and DeJohnette are superb associates, leading as much as following".

Track listing
All compositions by Joanne Brackeen.

 "Let Me Know" – 5:06
 "El Mayorazgo" – 6:39
 "Off Glimpse" – 7:17
 "Twin Dreams" – 5:41
 "Again and Always" – 5:50
 "Carmel Tea" – 6:01
 "The Grant" – 2:03

Personnel
Joanne Brackeen – piano
Eddie Gómez – bass
Jack DeJohnette – drums

References

Joanne Brackeen albums
1979 albums